The 2014 Valais Cup was an international football tournament that is part of the Valais Football Summer Cups. Matches being played on 6 July, 30 July and 31 July in Switzerland. It was the second running of the competition, following the 2013 edition. The tournament consisted of three matchdays for a total of three matches.

Participants
The tournament features European top-clubs:
 Benfica
 Shakhtar Donetsk
 Sion

Results
Matchdays 2 and 3 were originally scheduled for 12 July and 13 July but due to Benfica having problems with arriving to Switzerland matches were cancelled and moved to the 30 and 31 July.

Matchday 1

Matchday 2

Matchday 3
The game between Benfica and Shakhtar Donetsk was cancelled. On the third matchday, Benfica played the game against Spain's Athletic Bilbao. This match was not counted in the standings of the 2014 Valais Cup.

Standings

Awards
Best player:  Maxi Pereira (Benfica)

References

External links
 Official website

2014
2014–15 in Swiss football